The 2003 College Football All-America Team is composed of the following All-American Teams: Associated Press, Football Writers Association of America, American Football Coaches Association, Walter Camp Foundation, The Sporting News, Pro Football Weekly, Sports Illustrated, ESPN, and Rivals.com

The College Football All-America Team is an honor given annually to the best American college football players at their respective positions. The original usage of the term All-America seems to have been to such a list selected by football pioneer Walter Camp in the 1890s. The NCAA officially recognizes All-Americans selected by the AP, AFCA, FWAA, TSN, and the WCFF to determine Consensus All-Americans.

Eighteen players were recognized as consensus All-Americans for 2003, 12 of them unanimously. Unanimous selections are followed by an asterisk (*)

Offense

Quarterback
Jason White, Oklahoma (AP, AFCA-Coaches, Walter Camp, FWAA-Writers, TSN, PFW, SI, ESPN, Rivals)

Running back
Kevin Jones, Virginia Tech (AFCA-Coaches, Walter Camp, FWAA-Writers, TSN, ESPN)
Chris Perry, Michigan (AP, AFCA-Coaches, Walter Camp, TSN, PFW, SI, ESPN, Rivals)
Darren Sproles, Kansas State (AP, SI, Rivals)
Steven Jackson, Oregon State (PFW)

Wide receiver
Larry Fitzgerald, Pittsburgh (AP, AFCA-Coaches, Walter Camp, FWAA-Writers, TSN, PFW, SI, ESPN, Rivals)
Mike Williams, Southern California (AP, FWAA-Writers, Walter Camp, SI, ESPN, Rivals)
Rashaun Woods, Oklahoma State (AFCA-Coaches)
Mark Clayton, Oklahoma (TSN, PFW)

Tight end
Kellen Winslow Jr., Miami,(Fla.) (AP, AFCA-Coaches, Walter Camp, FWAA-Writers, TSN, PFW )
Ben Troupe, Florida (SI, ESPN, Rivals)

Tackle
Shawn Andrews, Arkansas (AP, AFCA-Coaches, Walter Camp, FWAA-Writers, TSN, PFW, SI, ESPN, Rivals)   
Robert Gallery, Iowa (AP, AFCA-Coaches, Walter Camp, FWAA-Writers, TSN, PFW, SI, ESPN, Rivals)   
Jacob Rogers, Southern California (AP, AFCA-Coaches, Walter Camp, FWAA-Writers, SI)   
Alex Barron, Florida State (AP, Walter Camp, FWAA-Writers, Rivals)   
Jammal Brown, Oklahoma (AFCA-Coaches, SI)

Guard
Stephen Peterman, LSU (TSN, SI, ESPN, Rivals)
Shannon Snell, Florida (TSN)
Justin Smiley, Alabama (PFW)
Lamar Bryant, Maryland (PFW)
Alex Stepanovich, Ohio State (ESPN)

Center
Jake Grove, Virginia Tech (AP, AFCA-Coaches, Walter Camp, FWAA-Writers, TSN, Rivals)
Nick Leckey, Kansas State (ESPN)

Defense

Ends
Dave Ball, UCLA (AFCA-Coaches, Walter Camp, FWAA-Writers, AP, TSN, SI, ESPN, Rivals)
Kenechi Udeze, Southern California (FWAA-Writers, AP, TSN, PFW, SI, ESPN, Rivals)
Will Smith, Ohio State (AFCA-Coaches, Walter Camp, PFW, SI, Rivals)
David Pollack, Georgia (AFCA-Coaches)

Tackle
Tommie Harris, Oklahoma (AP, AFCA-Coaches, FWAA-Writers, TSN, Walter Camp, ESPN)
Chad Lavalais, LSU (AP, FWAA-Writers, TSN, Walter Camp, SI, ESPN, Rivals)
Marcus Tubbs, Texas (PFW)
Tim Anderson, Ohio State  (PFW)

Linebacker
Teddy Lehman, Oklahoma (AP, AFCA-Coaches, Walter Camp, FWAA-Writers, TSN, PFW, SI, ESPN)
Derrick Johnson, Texas (AP, Walter Camp, FWAA-Writers, SI, ESPN, Rivals)
Grant Wiley, West Virginia (AP, FWAA-Writers, TSN, SI, Rivals)
Jonathan Vilma, Miami (Fla.) (AFCA-Coaches, Walter Camp, PFW, Rivals)
Karlos Dansby, Auburn (AFCA-Coaches, ESPN)
Josh Buhl, Kansas State (TSN)
Keyaron Fox, Georgia Tech (PFW)

Cornerback
Derrick Strait, Oklahoma (AP, AFCA-Coaches, Walter Camp, FWAA-Writers, TSN, SI, ESPN, Rivals)
Keiwan Ratliff, Florida (AP, Walter Camp, FWAA-Writers, TSN, PFW, SI, ESPN, Rivals)
Will Allen, Ohio State (AP, Walter Camp, FWAA-Writers)
Corey Webster, LSU (AFCA-Coaches)
 Nathan Vasher, Texas  (PFW)

Safety
Sean Taylor, Miami (Fla.) (AP, AFCA-Coaches, Walter Camp, FWAA-Writers, TSN, SI, ESPN, Rivals)
Sean Jones, Georgia (AFCA-Coaches)
Josh Bullocks, Nebraska (TSN, SI, Rivals)
Jim Leonhard, Wisconsin (ESPN)

Special teams

Kicker
Nate Kaeding, Iowa (AP, AFCA-Coaches, PFW, SI, ESPN)
Nick Browne, TCU (Walter Camp, FWAA-Writers)
Drew Dunning, Washington State (TSN, Rivals)

Punter
Dustin Colquitt, Tennessee (AP, Walter Camp, FWAA-Writers, TSN, Rivals)
Kyle Larson, Nebraska (AFCA-Coaches)
Tom Malone, Southern California (SI, ESPN)
Andy Lee, Pittsburgh  (PFW)

All-purpose player / return specialist
Antonio Perkins, Oklahoma (AP, AFCA-Coaches, FWAA-Writers, TSN, SI, Rivals)
Derek Abney, Kentucky (Walter Camp)
Skyler Green, LSU (SI, ESPN)

See also
 2003 All-Big 12 Conference football team
 2003 All-Big Ten Conference football team
 2003 All-SEC football team

References
AFCA
Associated Press
FWAA
TSN
Walter Camp
Pro Football Weekly, December 3, 2003
SI.com
Rivals.com (Archived 2009-05-14)

All-America Team
College Football All-America Teams